Perpetual motion is motion that continues indefinitely without any external source of energy.

Perpetual motion may also refer to:

Music
 Perpetuum mobile, music characterised by a continuous steady stream of notes, usually at a rapid tempo
 Trois mouvements perpétuels, a piano suite by Francis Poulenc

Albums
 Perpetual Motion, an album by the Dave Weckl Band
 Perpetual Motion (album), an album of classical material played on the banjo by Béla Fleck along with an assortment of accompanists
 The Perpetual Motion, a 2005 album by French progressive death metal band The Old Dead Tree

Songs
 "Perpetual Motion", a song by Anthrax from Stomp 442
 "Perpetual Motion", a song by Atavistic	
 "Perpetual Motion", a song by Billy Miller and the Great Blokes	1982
 "Perpetual Motion", a song by Neal Arden	1960
 "Perpetual Motion", a song by Procol Harum from The Prodigal Stranger 1991
 "Perpetual Motion", a song by Veronica Falls	2013

Other uses
 "Perpetual Motion" (novella), a short story in the Viagens Interplanetarias series by L. Sprague de Camp
 Perpetual Motion (solitaire), a one-person card game
 Perpetual Motion (film), a 2005 film directed by Ning Ying

See also
 
 Perpetuum Mobile (disambiguation)
 Perpetual Motion Machine (disambiguation)